James Ellwood Jones House is a historic home located at Switchback, McDowell County, West Virginia.  It is a two-story, frame dwelling with an irregular plan. It features a classically detailed, pedimented porch, and stained glass windows.  Also on the property are a contributing swimming pool dated to the 1920s, a detached covered patio, a circular fountain, terraced garden, and greenhouse.  It was built for James Ellwood Jones, an influential leader in southern West Virginia's coal mining industry.

It was listed on the National Register of Historic Places in 1992.

History
James Ellwood Jones (1874-1932)  was born in Trevertown, Pennsylvania. He was the general manager of the Pocahontas Fuel Company  which was founded by his father, Jenkin B Jones, the namesake for the coal town of Jenkinjones, West Virginia.

References

Houses on the National Register of Historic Places in West Virginia
Houses in McDowell County, West Virginia
National Register of Historic Places in McDowell County, West Virginia